Chavara Thekkumbhagom or Chavara South is a village in Kollam district in the Indian state of Kerala.

Notable people
 V.Sambasivan - a performer of the art Kadhaprasangam. written by himself and Othello by Shakespeare.
 Azhakathu Padmanabha Kurup, a renowned scholar in Sanskrit and Malayalam, who composed the first Malayalam epic poem Ramachandravilasam.

See also

Kollam
Karunagappalli
Thevalakkara
Neendakara
Chavara
Panakkattodil Devi Temple

References

External links
Kerala.gov.in
Klm.kerala.gov.in
Keralatourism.org

Islands of Kollam
Villages in Kollam district
Islands of India
Populated places in India